Charles Joseph Baker (born 6 January 1936) is an English former footballer who made more than 100 Football League appearances playing as a goalkeeper for Brighton & Hove Albion and Aldershot.

Life and career
Baker was born in Turners Hill, Sussex, in 1936. He played local football while completing an apprenticeship as a toolmaker and his National Service with the RAF before joining Brighton & Hove Albion in 1960. He made 81 league appearances over four seasons, which included 18 months as regular first choice, but remained a part-time player while working for a Crawley-based engineering company. He then played a further 28 league matches for Aldershot before returning to non-league football with Crawley Town.

References

1936 births
Living people
People from Turners Hill
English footballers
Association football goalkeepers
Horsham F.C. players
Brighton & Hove Albion F.C. players
Aldershot F.C. players
Crawley Town F.C. players
English Football League players